Mike Larry is a former American football coach.  He was the head football coach at the Carthage College in Kenosha, Wisconsin, serving for three seasons, from 1992 to 1994, and compiling a record of 2–25.

Head coaching record

References

Year of birth missing (living people)
Living people
Carthage Firebirds football coaches